Szklary  is a village in the administrative district of Gmina Jerzmanowice-Przeginia, within Kraków County, Lesser Poland Voivodeship, in southern Poland.

The village has a population of 612.

References

Szklary